Dillon Sheppard (born 27 February 1979) is a South African football coach and a former player who played as a left winger. He is an assistant coach of South African team Kaizer Chiefs.

External links
 
 
 

1979 births
South African soccer players
South African expatriate soccer players
South Africa international soccer players
Living people
FC Dynamo Moscow players
Sportspeople from Durban
White South African people
South African people of British descent
Panionios F.C. players
Association football midfielders
Mamelodi Sundowns F.C. players
Cape Town Spurs F.C. players
Platinum Stars F.C. players
Lamontville Golden Arrows F.C. players
Bidvest Wits F.C. players
Expatriate footballers in Russia
Expatriate footballers in Greece
Russian Premier League players
Super League Greece players
2002 African Cup of Nations players
Maritzburg United F.C. players
South African expatriate sportspeople in Russia
South African expatriate sportspeople in Greece
South African soccer managers